Mohamed Diriye Abdullahi (born 1958) is a Somali-Canadian scholar, linguist, writer, translator and professor.

Biography
Formerly a journalist in his native Somalia, Abdullahi emigrated to Canada, where he earned a Master's degree and a Ph.D. in linguistics from the Université de Montréal in Montreal, Quebec. He also earned a higher diploma in the instruction of French as a second language at the Université de Franche-comté in Besançon, France.

Abdullahi is fluent in Somali, Arabic, English and French. His research interests include the study of the Afro-Asiatic languages in general (particularly its Cushitic branch), as well as Somali history and culture.

He has also written numerous books, notably Culture and Customs of Somalia published by Greenwood Publishing Group in 2001, where he addresses the obscure origins of the Somali people, among other topics.

Abdullahi currently teaches linguistics at the Université de Montréal. He also works as a freelance translator and language consultant.

Bibliography

Major publications

Manuscripts and projects
 

 The Evolution and Meaning of the Cardinal Directions in Somali—Paper showing how the four words for the cardinal directions in the Somali language evolved into their present forms.
 The Diachronic Development of the Progressive in Somali—Paper discussing the formation of the progressive tense in the Somali language.

Dissertation

See also
 Somali Studies

References

External links
 Diriye's Homepage
 The Somali Language Page

1958 births
Living people
Somalian emigrants to Canada
Université de Montréal alumni
University of Franche-Comté alumni
Somalian writers
Ethnic Somali people
Linguists from Somalia
Somalian scientists
Somalian non-fiction writers
Somalian scholars
Somalists